{{DISPLAYTITLE:C11H15BrN2O3}}
The molecular formula C11H15BrN2O3 (molar mass: 303.15 g/mol, exact mass: 302.0266 u) may refer to:

 Butallylonal
 Narcobarbital

Molecular formulas